The 1914 Canton Professionals season was their fifth season in the Ohio League. The team finished with a known record of 9–1.

Schedule

Game notes

References

Canton Bulldogs seasons
Canton Bulldogs
Canton Bulldogs